Gopal Mayekar (Portuguese India, 1934 – 22 July 2021) was a writer and a leader of Maharashtrawadi Gomantak Party. He was a member of 9th Lok Sabha from North Goa. He served as minister in Dayanand Bandodkar's ministry of Goa, Daman and Diu from 1967  to 1970. He received the Kala Academy Award for best poetry in 1987 for Swapnamegh. He died at the age of 87 on 22 July 2021.

References

1934 births
2021 deaths
Poets from Goa
India MPs 1989–1991
Maharashtrawadi Gomantak Party politicians
Marathi-language writers
People from North Goa district
Goa, Daman and Diu MLAs 1967–1972